Symphyotrichum moranense (formerly Aster moranensis) is a species of flowering plant in the family Asteraceae. Its white ray florets open October through April, and it is native to Mexico.

Gallery

Distribution and habitat

Citations

References

moranense
Flora of Mexico
Plants described in 1818
Taxa named by Carl Sigismund Kunth